Aldis Intlers (24 April 1965 in Liepāja – 28 August 1994) was a Latvian-born Soviet bobsledder who competed from the late 1980s to the mid-1990s. He won a bronze medal in the two-man event at the 1989 FIBT World Championships in Cortina d'Ampezzo.

Competing in two Winter Olympics, Intlers earned his best finish of 11th in the two-man event at Lillehammer in 1994.

Intlers died 28 August 1994 in a car accident, he was 29 years old.

References

External links 
 
 
 
 1992 bobsleigh two-man results
 1992 bobsleigh four-man results
 1994 bobsleigh two-man results
 1994 bobsleigh four-man results
 

1965 births
1994 deaths
Sportspeople from Liepāja
Bobsledders at the 1992 Winter Olympics
Bobsledders at the 1994 Winter Olympics
Latvian male bobsledders
Russian male bobsledders
Soviet male bobsledders
Olympic bobsledders of Latvia